Olha Bodnar is a Ukrainian politician, People's Deputy of Ukraine, member of the 5th and 6th convocations of Verkhovna Rada of Ukraine, member of the fraction Yulia Tymoshenko Bloc.

Biography
Olha Bodnar was born on 19 February 1965 in Yampil, Vinnytsia Oblast. In 1987 she graduated from Kyiv National University, Department of Physics, qualified as physicist (molecular physics), and physics teacher.

Career
 1998-2002 - assistant to the People's Deputy of Ukraine
 2002-2006 - Head of the Secretariat of the BYuT parliamentary fraction in Verkhovna Rada of Ukraine
 May 2006 - June 2007 - People's Deputy of the 5th Verkhovna Rada (elected from the Yulia Tymoshenko Bloc, No. 126 in the list).
She was performing the duties of chairman of the subcommittee on state building and the administrative reform committee on state building, regional policy and local government (since July 2006). Olha Bodnar also has been the BYuT fraction member since May 2006.
 November 2007 - People's Deputy of the 6th Verkhovna Rada (elected from the Yulia Tymoshenko Bloc, No. 85 in the list)

In Verkhovna Rada Olha Bodnar is performing the following duties:

 First Deputy Chairman of Verkhovna Rada Committee on State Building and Local Government
 Deputy Co-Chairman of the Interparliamentary Assembly of the Verkhovna Rada of Ukraine and the Seimas of the Republic of Lithuania
 Member of the Ukrainian part of the Interparliamentary Assembly of the Verkhovna Rada of Ukraine, the Seimas of the Republic of Lithuania and the Sejm and Senate of Poland
 Member of the Ukrainian part of the Interparliamentary Assembly of Ukraine and the Republic of Poland
 Head of the Group for Interparliamentary Relations with the Republic of Lithuania
 Deputy Head of the Group for Interparliamentary Relations with Finland
 Deputy Head of the Group for Interparliamentary Relations with Montenegro
 Member of the Group for Interparliamentary Relations with Russia
 Member of the Group for Interparliamentary Relations with the United States of America
 Member of the Group for Interparliamentary Relations with the Italian Republic
 Member of the Group for Interparliamentary Relations with the Federal Republic of Germany
 Member of the Group for Interparliamentary Relations with the Swiss Confederation
 Member of the Group for Interparliamentary Relations with the Kingdom of Sweden
 Member of the Group for Interparliamentary Relations with the Kingdom of Denmark
 Member of the Group for Interparliamentary Relations with the Kingdom of Malaysia
 Member of the Group for Interparliamentary Relations with the Republic of Hungary
 Member of the Group for Interparliamentary Relations with Latvia
 Member of the Group for Interparliamentary Relations with the Kingdom of Belgium
 Member of the Group for Interparliamentary Relations with the Kingdom of Norway
 Member of the Group for Interparliamentary Relations with Australia
 Member of the Group for Interparliamentary Relations with the Republic of Estonia
 Member of the Group for Interparliamentary Relations with the United Kingdom of Great Britain and Northern Ireland
 Member of the Group for Interparliamentary Relations with the Kingdom of the Netherlands
 Member of the Group for Interparliamentary Relations with Israel
 Member of the Group for Interparliamentary Relations with Poland

In 2012 she was not re-elected into parliament on the party list of "Fatherland" (number 116).

See also 
 List of Ukrainian Parliament Members 2007
 Verkhovna Rada

References 

Living people
1965 births
People from Vinnytsia Oblast
Taras Shevchenko National University of Kyiv alumni
All-Ukrainian Union "Fatherland" politicians
Fifth convocation members of the Verkhovna Rada
Sixth convocation members of the Verkhovna Rada
21st-century Ukrainian politicians
21st-century Ukrainian women politicians
Laureates of the Honorary Diploma of the Verkhovna Rada of Ukraine
Women members of the Verkhovna Rada